Budhal may refer to:
 Budhal (tribe), an ethnic group of South Asia
 Budhal tehsil, a village and tehsil in Jammu and Kashmir, India
 Budhal Faqir (1865–1939), Sufi saint

See also 
 
 Badhal, a 1996 Maldivian film